Frozen Crown is an Italian power metal band formed 2017 in Milan, Lombardy.

History
In 2018, their debut album, The Fallen King, garnered considerable media exposure. Four tracks from the album were also released as singles, notably Kings, which has around four million views on YouTube. The band's second album, Crowned In Frost, was released in 2019. In the following year three of the album's tracks were made into videos, with Neverending at over seven million views on YouTube.

In April 2019, Frozen Crown played ten European venues together with Israeli metal act Desert and fellow Italian act Elvenking, while in the following summer they appeared at Metalfest Czech Republic and Sabaton Open Air in Sweden. In February 2020, they toured 13 European cities in support of British metal group DragonForce. A summer tour in 2020 including venues in Spain had to be called off due to the COVID-19 pandemic. In November 2020, the band announced that their third album was officially in pre-production.

In January 2021, it was announced that Alberto, Thalìa and Filippo departed from the band in 2020 to focus on personal projects. On 18 February, new band members Fabiola "Sheena" Bellomo, Francesco Zof and Niso Tomasini were announced.

On 23 April 2021, the band released its third studio album, Winterbane, having been preceded by its lead single Far Beyond already on 26 February.

Band members 
Current members
 Giada "Jade" Etro – vocals (2017–present)
 Federico Mondelli – guitars, keyboards, vocals (2017–present)
 Fabiola "Sheena" Bellomo – guitars (2021–present)
 Francesco Zof – bass (2021–present)
 Niso Tomasini – drums (2021–present)

Former members
 Thalia Bellazecca – guitars (2017–2020)
 Filippo Zavattari – bass (2017–2020)
 Alberto Mezzanotte – drums (2017–2020)

Timeline

Discography

Studio albums 
 The Fallen King (2018)
 Crowned in Frost (2019)
 Winterbane (2021)
 Call of the North (2023)

References

Italian power metal musical groups
Italian heavy metal musical groups
Scarlet Records artists
Musical groups established in 2017
Musical groups from Milan
2017 establishments in Italy
Female-fronted musical groups